Žbontar is a surname. Notable people with the surname include:

Franci Žbontar (born 1952), Yugoslav ice hockey player
Marjan Žbontar (born 1954), Yugoslav ice hockey player, brother of Franci
 (born 1982), Slovene ice hockey player and coach